Sergio Rivas (born 3 October 1997) is a Mexican professional footballer who plays as an attacking midfielder for USL Championship club New Mexico United.

Career

College
Rivas spent his entire college career at Seattle University. He made a total of 85 appearances for the Redhawks and tallied 21 goals and 27 assists.

While at college, Rivas played for Premier Development League sides Albuquerque Sol and Seattle Sounders FC U-23.

Professional
On January 11, 2019, Rivas was selected 26th overall in the 2019 MLS SuperDraft by San Jose Earthquakes. On March 20, 2019, Rivas signed with San Jose's USL Championship affiliate side Reno 1868 FC. Reno folded their team on November 6, 2020, due to the financial impact of the COVID-19 pandemic.

On December 24, 2020, Rivas signed with USL Championship side New Mexico United ahead of their 2021 season.

Career statistics

References

External links
Seattle Redhawks bio

1997 births
Living people
People from Parral, Chihuahua
Mexican footballers
American soccer players
Mexican emigrants to the United States
Albuquerque Sol FC players
Association football midfielders
Reno 1868 FC players
San Jose Earthquakes draft picks
Seattle Redhawks men's soccer players
Seattle Sounders FC U-23 players
Soccer players from Albuquerque, New Mexico
USL Championship players
USL League Two players
New Mexico United players